Valery Nikolayevich Karasyov (born 23 September 1946) is a retired Russian gymnast. He competed at the 1968 Summer Olympics in all artistic gymnastics events and won a silver medal in the team competition. Individually his best result was fifth place in the floor exercise. At the world championships Karasyov won team silver medals in 1966 and 1970. He married Olga Karasyova, a Russian gymnast who also competed at the 1968 Olympics.

References

1946 births
Soviet male artistic gymnasts
Living people
Gymnasts at the 1968 Summer Olympics
Olympic gymnasts of the Soviet Union
Olympic silver medalists for the Soviet Union
Olympic medalists in gymnastics
Russian male artistic gymnasts
Medalists at the 1968 Summer Olympics
Medalists at the World Artistic Gymnastics Championships
Gymnasts from Moscow